One Blood may refer to:

Una Sangre/One Blood Lila Downs album 2004, One Blood Tour
One Blood, reggae band Barry Boom
One Blood (Yothu Yindi album), an album by Yothu Yindi
It's Okay (One Blood), a song by American rapper The Game